Christine Kuo (born 11 July 1983) is a Taiwanese-Canadian actress based in Hong Kong. She is of mixed Dutch, Korean and Taiwanese aborigine parentage. She was the winner of the Miss Chinese Toronto Pageant 2008 and Miss Chinese International Pageant 2009.

Career
She won four awards at the 2008 Miss Chinese Toronto Pageant:  Miss Photogenic,  Miss Fittest Posture, Miss Popularity and Miss Most Beautiful Hair. In January 2009, she represented Toronto to compete in the Miss Chinese International Pageant 2009 as a favorite contestant due to her awards and popularity. She was then awarded the Miss International Charm Award and later was crowned winner of Miss Chinese International 2009.

She signed a 6-year contract with TVB  and moved from Toronto to Hong Kong to pursue a career in the entertainment industry.

She returned as a judge in the Miss Chinese Toronto Pageant 2009.

Personal life
Kuo's parents are Taiwanese-born and are of Dutch, Korean and Chinese descent.

Filmography

Film

Television series

Music video
2009: Leo Ku, 沒有腳的小鳥 (TVB version)
2010: Raymond Lam, 我們很好 (TVB version)

Awards
Next TV Awards 2013-Most Promising Female Artist

References

External links

Official Blog

1983 births
Living people
Actresses from Toronto
Canadian actresses of Taiwanese descent
21st-century Canadian actresses
21st-century Hong Kong actresses
Hong Kong film actresses
Hong Kong people of Taiwanese descent
Hong Kong people of Dutch descent
Hong Kong people of Korean descent
Hong Kong television actresses
Canadian emigrants to Hong Kong
Canadian actresses of Chinese descent
Canadian people of Dutch descent
Canadian actresses of Korean descent
Miss Chinese International winners
People with acquired residency of Hong Kong
Taiwanese indigenous peoples
Taiwanese emigrants to Canada
Taiwanese film actresses
Taiwanese television actresses
Taiwanese people of Dutch descent
Taiwanese people of Korean descent
TVB actors
Taiwanese-born Hong Kong artists